Richard de Braylegh was Dean of Exeter between 1335 and 1353.

Notes

Deans of Exeter